The 2023 Challenger La Manche was a professional tennis tournament played on indoor hard courts. It was the 30th edition of the tournament which was part of the 2023 ATP Challenger Tour. It took place in Cherbourg, France between 13 and 19 February 2023.

Singles main-draw entrants

Seeds

 1 Rankings are as of 6 February 2023.

Other entrants
The following players received wildcards into the singles main draw:
  Dan Added
  Clément Chidekh
  Kenny de Schepper

The following players received entry into the singles main draw as alternates:
  Raphaël Collignon
  Michael Geerts
  Mats Moraing
  Nikolás Sánchez Izquierdo

The following players received entry from the qualifying draw:
  Titouan Droguet
  Karl Friberg
  Gauthier Onclin
  Johan Tatlot
  Alexey Vatutin
  Denis Yevseyev

Champions

Singles

 Giulio Zeppieri def.  Titouan Droguet 7–5, 7–6(7–4).

Doubles

 Ivan Liutarevich /  Vladyslav Manafov def.  Karol Drzewiecki /  Kacper Żuk 7–6(12–10), 7–6(9–7).

References

2023 ATP Challenger Tour
2023
February 2023 sports events in France
2023 in French tennis